The Simurq 2013–14 season was Simurq's eighth Azerbaijan Premier League season. They finished 7th in the Premier League and reached the Second Round of the Azerbaijan Cup where they were defeated by Araz. It is Giorgi Chikhradze's second full season as manager.

Squad

Transfers

Summer

In:

 

 

 

 

 

 

Out:

Winter

In:

 
 
 

Out:

Competitions

Friendlies

Azerbaijan Premier League

Results summary

Results by round

Results

League table

Azerbaijan Cup

Squad statistics

Appearances and goals

|-
|colspan="14"|Players who appeared for Simurq no longer at the club:

|}

Goal scorers

Disciplinary record

References

External links 
 Simurq at Soccerway.com
 Official Website

Simurq PIK seasons
Simurq